Jack Smart is the name of:

Jack Smart (footballer), English footballer
Jack Smart (cricketer) (1891–1979), Warwickshire first-class cricketer and Test cricket umpire
J. Scott Smart (1902–1960), American actor
John Elliott Smart (1916–2008), Royal Navy officer
J. J. C. Smart (1920–2012), Australian philosopher

See also 
John Smart (disambiguation)